Buren is both a given name and a surname. Notable people with the name include:

Given name:
Buren Bayaer (1960–2018), Chinese singer and composer
Buren R. Sherman (1836–1904), American politician
Buren Skeen (1936–1965), American NASCAR driver

Surname:
Daniel Buren (born 1938), French artist

See also
Büren (disambiguation)
Van Buren (disambiguation)